Melanophila consputa, the charcoal beetle, is a species of metallic wood-boring beetle in the family Buprestidae. It is found in Central America, North America, and Oceania. Like other members of their genus, charcoal beetles are drawn to forest fires, which they find using sensors near their legs that detect infrared radiation. Female charcoal beetles then lay their eggs in the charred remains of coniferous trees. They have been known to swarm large groups of smokers and bite humans.

References

Further reading

External links

 

Buprestidae
Articles created by Qbugbot
Beetles described in 1857